The Loskutnaya Hotel (Лоскутная) was a hotel on Tverskaya Street in Moscow. The hotel, built in the 19th Century, was located by the Manege Square, near the Historical Museum and Iverskaia Gate. Geir Kjetsaa, author of Fyodor Dostoyevsky: A Writer's Life, said that the hotel was "one of the best hotels in town." Leonid Andreev and Pyotr Boborykin often stayed at the hotel. A group of people with Anton Chekhov also stayed at Loskutnaya. It was later renamed to the Red Fleet Hostel, and many students and younger members of the Communist Party of Russia stayed at the hotel. During Communist rule, some rooms were reserved for Naval College members and sailor delegates.

References

Hotels in Moscow
Defunct hotels in Russia
Demolished buildings and structures in Moscow
Buildings and structures demolished in 1938